BBC's 100 Greatest Foreign Language Films is a list compiled in 2018 by BBC Culture, as part of their annual critics' poll.

Selection Criteria 
BBC Culture polled 209 film critics from 43 different countries, asking them to submit their list of the 10 greatest foreign-language movies (i.e. not in English). As with other BBC Culture 100 Greatest polls, the ranking was established by a point system: ten points awarded to the film ranked first, nine to the film ranked second and so forth.

Criticism 
Writing for Vanity Fair, K. Austin Collins lamented the predictability of the list - "heavy on works from Europe and East Asia; low on women; low on avant garde and documentary filmmaking" - and the absence of popular genres such as Nollywood, Bollywood or Giallo, arguing that "a truly worthy list of this nature wouldn’t be so snobby about high and low culture. It’d be a glorious, messy mix of arthouse and pop, as any list about the greatest art—rather than the greatest textbook art—should be."

Full List

References 

BBC-related lists
Top film lists
Film criticism
2018 in film